Sandra Sabattini (19 August 1961 – 2 May 1984) was an Italian Catholic woman and a member of the Associazione Comunità Papa Giovanni XXIII. Sandra Sabattini first joined the association after meeting its founder, Oreste Benzi, in her late childhood and began to work alongside drug addicts and ill people with the dream of becoming part of the medical missions in Africa. It was later on that she became engaged but her life was cut short after being run over in a car accident while going to attend a meeting of the association near Rimini.

Benzi promoted the opening of her cause of beatification and permission for this was granted over two decades later, not long before Benzi himself died. The cause opened and she was given the title of Servant of God. On 6 March 2018 Pope Francis confirmed her heroic virtue and bestowed on her the title Venerable. In October 2019 he confirmed a miracle attributed to her intercession. Sandra Sabattini was meant to be beatified in Rimini on 14 June 2020 but the coronavirus pandemic forced the Rimini diocese to postpone the ceremony. It was rescheduled and celebrated in Rimini on 24 October 2021.

Life
Sandra Sabattini was born on 19 August 1961 in Rimini at the Riccione Hospital as the first of two children to Giuseppe Sabattini and Agnese Bonini; her brother was Raffaele, now a medical doctor working at Ceccarini Hospital in Riccione. The Sabattini's lived in Misano Adriatico before relocating to Rimini in 1965 to the parish church of San Girolamo to live with her priest uncle Giuseppe Bonini, the pastor of the parish.

Sandra Sabattini's pious nature as a child extended to keeping a journal since 27 January 1972 in order to record her spiritual thoughts. It was around 1973 that she first met the priest Oreste Benzi, who had founded the Associazione Comunità Papa Giovanni XXIII. The encounter occurred at one of the association's meetings organized by her uncle in his parish. In summer 1974 she took part in a summer program for teenagers at the Madonna delle Vette house in Canazei (Trento) for people with disabilities. This experience left her with such a profound spiritual enthusiasm that upon returning home she told her mother: "We worked till we dropped but these are people I'll never leave". In 1980 she completed her high school examinations in Rimini before beginning her studies in medicine at the University of Bologna. She achieved excellent results in each of her examinations.

However, she harboured within her a desire to become part of the medical missions in Africa to work alongside the poor and sick. On the weekends and in the summer breaks of 1982 and 1983 she attended to drug addicts in the association's rehabilitation centers. Each morning she got up early to meditate in the church in the dark before the Eucharist and would do so sitting on the floor. In this period she sang in a choir and learned the piano. Sandra Sabattini later met Guido (who was a bit older than her) at a Carnivale event. The two started dating and were later engaged to be married though both decided to lead a chaste engagement. To their delight they discovered that they shared a desire to become missionaries in Africa after getting married, but her father – who knew of the couple's aspirations – advised his daughter to take things at a slow pace rather than to rush into things.

In late April 1984 the association arranged a meeting in Igea Marina near Rimini. On 29 April at 9:30 am Sandra arrived there by car in the company of her fiancé and her friend Elio. Just as she got out of the car both she and Elio were struck by a passing car, sending her into a coma from which she never recovered. Less than a week later, on 2 May, Sandra died from her injuries at Bellaria Hospital in Bologna. Her funeral was celebrated on 5 May in the San Girolamo church in Rimini and she was buried in the churchyard of the S. Andrea church of Misano Adriatico.

In 1985 Benzi published a first edition of her journal and in 2003 published another edition incorporating notes on her life. Benzi once said that "Sandra should not be sought among the dead" alluding to potential exhumation. Benzi's intuition proved correct for in 2009 (after his death) an exhumation took place but no remains were found. This was attributed to the fact that she wished to be buried in bare earth which meant corrosion of the casket following interment was most probable.

Beatification
The Bishops' Conference of Emilia Romagna on 30 January 2006 communicated to the Congregation for the Causes of Saints (C.S.S.) an opinion favorable to initiating proceedings for the cause of beatification of Sandra Sabattini. This was something that Benzi had petitioned for after her death. The C.S.S. gave its assent on 11 July 2006 after declaring "nihil obstat" (no objections) and assigning to Sandra Sabattini the title of Servant of God. The diocesan process of enquiry was opened on 27 September 2006 and was concluded on 6 December 2008.

The Positio dossier was submitted to the C.S.S. for examination; theologians attested to validity of the cause and the C.S.S. confirmed this on 6 March 2018. It was also on 6 March that Pope Francis confirmed that Sandra Sabattini lived a model life of heroic virtue and bestowed on her the title of Venerable. On 2 October 2019 the Pope confirmed the authenticity of a miracle attributed to her intercession which opened the way to her beatification. The Rimini diocese announced on 1 November 2019 that the beatification would take place on 14 June 2020. However, the coronavirus pandemic obliged the diocese to announce on 6 April 2020 that the beatification would be postponed until further notice. The celebration was rescheduled and celebrated on 24 October 2021.

The current postulator for the cause is Fausto Lanfranchi.

References

External links
 Hagiography Circle
 Associazione Comunità Papa Giovanni XXIII
 Find a Grave

1961 births
1984 deaths
20th-century Italian people
20th-century venerated Christians
Beatifications by Pope Francis
Italian Roman Catholics
Pedestrian road incident deaths
People from Rimini
Road incident deaths in Italy
Venerated Catholics by Pope Francis